Luis Alberto Héber Fontana (born 1957) is a Uruguayan political figure of the National Party, serving as Minister of Interior, since May 24, 2021.  He previously served as Minister of Transport and Public Works (from March 1, 2020 to May 24, 2021), Senator (1995–2020) and as National Representative (1985–1995).

Background 

Luis Alberto Héber comes from a prominent Uruguayan National Party family; he himself has also for many years associated himself with this party's cause. His father Mario Héber Usher was a prominent Senator among his Party's leadership. His uncle Alberto Héber Usher was President of Uruguay 1966–1967. He was married to the late Beatrice Dominici, Italian, until her death. They have two daughters.

Political career 

In 1989 Héber was elected to serve as a National Representative, and served as President of the Chamber of Deputies of Uruguay from March 1, 1993 to March 1, 1994. In the 1994 election he was elected Senator, and in subsequent years was repeatedly re-elected.

Héber was appointed Minister of Transport and Public Works on December 16, 2019, days after the victory of Luis Lacalle Pou. He took office on March 1, in replacement of Víctor Rossi. However, after the sudden death of Interior Minister Jorge Larrañaga, on May 24, 2021, President Lacalle Pou carried out a cabinet reshuffle; Héber was appointed in replacement of Larrañaga as head of the Ministry of the Interior, and José Luis Falero held the ministerial portfolio of Transport and Public Works.

Family incident and diplomatic repercussions

It has been notably alleged by Senator Luis Alberto Héber, who is a son of Cecilia Fontana de Héber, assassinated by person(s) unknown in 1978, that records may show that the US Embassy in Montevideo had knowledge of this tragic incident.  According to Senator Héber, his mother was assassinated because of efforts of local secret intelligence circles to preserve in office President Aparicio Méndez, alleged again by Senator Héber to have been a CIA asset. Again according to Senator Héber, the US Embassy was playing a 'double game' in 1978, talking human rights but simultaneously working with Uruguayan secret intelligence figures in order to defend President Méndez's position.

In 2008 US Ambassador to Uruguay Frank E. Baxter was involved in controversial, high level exchanges regarding Uruguayan investigations into Senator Héber's mother's assassination and the allegations which arose from the tragic incident.

See also 

 Politics of Uruguay
 List of political families#Uruguay
 Frank E. Baxter#Admits Mitrione case 'pushback' equivalence in response to Uruguayan assassination investigation

References 

Sources
 :es:Luis Alberto Heber

1957 births
Uruguayan people of German descent
Uruguayan people of Italian descent
Presidents of the Chamber of Representatives of Uruguay
Members of the Chamber of Representatives of Uruguay
Members of the Senate of Uruguay
Living people
National Party (Uruguay) politicians
Ministers of Transport and Public Works of Uruguay